Reginald Jack Craig (3 August 1916 – 17 April 1985) was an Australian cricketer. He played thirty-one first-class matches for South Australia between 1945/46 and 1950/51.

References

External links
 

1916 births
1985 deaths
Australian cricketers
South Australia cricketers
Cricketers from Adelaide
Australian Army personnel of World War II
Australian Army soldiers